Copperville is an unincorporated community in Carroll County, Maryland, United States.

References

Unincorporated communities in Carroll County, Maryland
Unincorporated communities in Maryland